Darwinia thymoides  is a species of flowering plant in the myrtle family Myrtaceae and is endemic to the south-west of Western Australia. It is a low, spreading to prostrate shrub with linear to lance-shaped leaves and groups of 4 to 8 green, red or white flowers surrounded by leaf-like bracts.

Description
The flowers are arranged on the ends of branches in sessile groups of 4 to 8, surrounded by leaf-like bracts and short, broad bracteoles that fall off early. Flowering mainly occurs in December and January.

Taxonomy
This species was first formally described in 1839 by John Lindley who gave it the name Hedaroma thymoides in A Sketch of the Vegetation of the Swan River Colony. In 1865, George Bentham changed the name to Darwinia thymoides in the Journal of the Linnean Society, Botany. The specific epithet (thymoides) means "thyme-like".

Distribution and habitat
Darwinia thymoides grows on granite outcrops and along creeks in sandy to loam or clay soils in the Avon Wheatbelt, Jarrah Forest, Swan Coastal Plain and Warren bioregions of south-western Western Australia.

References

thymoides
Endemic flora of Western Australia
Myrtales of Australia
Rosids of Western Australia
Plants described in 1839
Taxa named by John Lindley